Carlos Eduardo de Sousa Braga (born December 6, 1960) is a Brazilian politician and businessman, currently a republic senator from Amazonas.
Better known as Eduardo Braga, he was a councilman of Manaus (1981–1985), state deputy of amazonas (1987–1991), federal deputy from amazonas (1991–1993), vice-mayor of Manaus (1993–1994) and mayor of Manaus (1994–1997). He campaigned for the government of Amazonas in 1998 and for the city hall of Manaus in 2000 without success. He was elected governor of Amazonas in October 2002, in the first turn, with 52.4% of the votes, and assumed office on 1 January 2003. In 2006, Braga was re-elected, in the first turn. He renounced in 2010 to run for the Senate on the elections of that year.

On January 1, 2015, he was named Minister of Mines and Energy in the cabinet of Dilma Rousseff.

He is a member of the Brazilian Democratic Movement (MDB).

See also
 List of mayors of Manaus

References 

|-

Living people
1960 births
People from Belém
Governors of Amazonas (Brazilian state)
Mayors of Manaus
Brazilian Democratic Movement politicians
Members of the Chamber of Deputies (Brazil) from Amazonas
Members of the Legislative Assembly of Amazonas
Federal University of Amazonas alumni
Energy ministers of Brazil